Patnam Vachina Pativrathalu is a 1982 Telugu film produced by Atluri Radha Krishna Murthy and directed by Mouli in his Telugu debut. The film stars Chiranjeevi, Mohan Babu, Radhika, Geetha, Rao Gopal Rao and Nutan Prasad in important roles. The film is a remake of the 1980 Kannada movie Pattanakke Banda Pathniyaru. The song Shankara Gangadhara from the Kannada version was retained in this movie. The film ran for 280 days.

Plot
Gopi (Chiranjeevi) and Mohan Babu are brothers living with their grandmother in a village. Gopi is youngest brother and has a B.Sc. in Agriculture and he is willing to live in the village after marriage, while Mohan Babu is an elder one who is uneducated. Gopi and Mohan Babu marry at the same time, Mohan Babu marries Devi, who is an educated person, while Gopi marries Lalithamba, an uneducated girl. Lalithamba prefers to live in the city after marriage. Lalithamba and Devi try their level best to shift their house to the city, but their husbands Gopi and Mohan Babu disagree. At last, Lalithamba and Devi escape from their house one night, without their husbands' knowledge. Lalithamba has one friend Shakuntala, in the city. Devi and Lalithamba are unable to locate Shakuntala's house in the city; roaming on the streets, they were caught by one woman who attempts to sell them to a brothel owner, Ganga Devi. But their contract does not materialize, and that woman doesn't sell Devi and Lalitamba. Angered, Ganga Devi sends her people to bring Lalithaba and Devi. Here, Ganga Devi's people kill that woman, but could not catch Lalithamba and Devi. But their bad luck chases them and Lalithamba and Devi enter Ganga Devi's house for protection, without knowing her character. But later they understand and plan to escape from there. Meanwhile, Lalithamba finds her friend Shakuntala, and with her help, Lalithamba and Devi try to escape from there, but Ganga Devi's people catch them and lock them in a room. Chiru and Mohan Babu, in search of their wives, land in the city to find Devi and Lalithaba and with much effort, they gather information on their wives' whereabouts. They enter into Ganga Devi's house and save Lalithamba and Devi from her clutches. As usual, police arrive after the climax fight and Ganga Devi is arrested, and these four return to their village.

Cast 
 Chiranjeevi - Gopi
 Raadhika Sarathkumar - Lalithamba
 Mohan Babu - 
 Geetha - Devi
 Nirmalamma - Narayanamma, Grand mother of Gopi
 Ramaprabha - Arundhatamma
 Nutan Prasad
 Rao Gopal Rao

Soundtrack
 "Neekunnadhe Kaastha" -
 "SeethaRaama Swamy" -
 "Shankaraa Gangaadharaa" -
 "Vinukondi" -

References

External links

1982 films
1980s Telugu-language films
Films scored by Satyam (composer)
Telugu remakes of Kannada films
Films directed by T. S. B. K. Moulee